= NCAA independent schools =

NCAA independent schools may refer to:

- NCAA Division I independent schools
- NCAA Division I FBS independent schools
- NCAA Division I FCS independent schools
- NCAA Division II independent schools
- NCAA Division III independent schools
